Caproventuria is a genus of fungi in the family Venturiaceae. This is a monotypic genus, containing the single species Caproventuria hanliniana.

References

External links
Caproventuria at Index Fungorum

Monotypic Dothideomycetes genera
Venturiaceae